Blind Alfred Reed (June 15, 1880 – January 17, 1956) was an American folk, country, and old-time musician and singer-songwriter. He was one of the artists who recorded at the Bristol Sessions in 1927, alongside more famous names such as Jimmie Rodgers and The Carter Family. He played the fiddle along with his son Arville, who played the guitar. He is perhaps most well known for the songs "The Wreck of the Virginian" and "How Can a Poor Man Stand Such Times and Live?", the latter of which has been covered many times, including versions by Bruce Springsteen, Ry Cooder, and the New Lost City Ramblers.

Early life
Alfred was born completely blind, in Floyd County, Virginia, being the second blind child born to Riley & Charlotte (Akers) Reed. He was raised in a very conservative family, the son of a farm laborer, and he acquired a violin at a young age. Later, he began performing at county fairs, in country schoolhouses, for political rallies, and in churches. He even played on street corners for tips. He used to sell out printed copies of his compositions for ten cents each. This is about all the information that can be gathered from him in his early life, as most of the events during this time were not written down nor talked about much in his later years.

Career
While playing during a convention in 1927, Ralph Peer, who was the director of the Bristol Sessions, heard Reed playing "The Wreck of the Virginian", and asked him if he wanted to make some recordings. Reed consented, and he recorded four songs, one solo,  "The Wreck of the Virginian", and three with Arville's guitar accompaniment: "I Mean to Live for Jesus", "You Must Unload", and "Walking in the Way with Jesus". After the Bristol Sessions, Reed kept recording until 1929, which was the year of his most famous song's release "How Can a Poor Man Stand Such Times and Live?".

After 1929, he stopped recording and lived out the rest of his life mostly in the Princeton area in Mercer County, West Virginia. Reed continued to perform locally until 1937 when a statute was passed prohibiting blind street musicians. In addition to being recording artist and a musician, he also served as a lay preacher Methodist church minister. In 1956, Reed died, supposedly of starvation. He is buried in Elgood, West Virginia.

Legacy
Reed's lyrics, all of which he composed himself, were ostensibly very conservative, but always were presented with a sense of humor; for example "Why Do You Bob Your Hair, Girls?" was an over-the-top commentary against women's hair style fashion of the 1920s, in which women who wore a shingle-bob were instructed to "ask Jesus to forgive" their hair style. More than half of the songs he recorded were religious or political or spoke out against society's ills. Because of his social commentary, which was somewhat uncommon then, some people today consider Reed an early "protest" singer.

In 2007, Blind Alfred Reed was inducted into the West Virginia Music Hall of Fame, alongside other famous musicians from West Virginia. Also in 2007, a tribute album to Blind Alfred, named for one of his songs, was released. Always Lift Him Up: A Tribute to Blind Alfred Reed features nineteen of Reed's most famous songs, recorded by artists from West Virginia, such as Little Jimmy Dickens, Tim O'Brien and Ann Magnuson.

In 2020, Reed's song "How Can A Poor Man Stand Such Times and Live" was added to the Grammy Hall of Fame.

Original discography

Discography 
 Blind Alfred Reed - Complete Recorded Works in Chronological Order (Document DOCD-8022, 2 March 1998)

Notes

References

External links
 Illustrated Blind Alfred Reed discography
 

1880 births
1956 deaths
American folk musicians
Old-time musicians
American country singer-songwriters
American fiddlers
Blind musicians
People from Floyd County, Virginia
20th-century American singers
20th-century American violinists
20th-century American male singers
American male singer-songwriters
Singer-songwriters from Virginia
People from Princeton, West Virginia